Alonzo Tucker may refer to:

Alonzo Tucker (lynching victim), African American murder victim from Oregon 
Alonzo Tucker, American musician and founder of The Midnighters
Alonzo P. Tucker, a recurring character in the TV series Lost in Space portrayed by Albert Salmi